The  is Japanese aerial lift line in Tsukuba, Ibaraki, operated by . It is the only aerial lift (ropeway) the company operates, while it also operates a funicular line (Mount Tsukuba Cable Car), hotels and restaurants. The company belongs to Keisei Group.

The Swiss-made ropeway, opened in 1965, climbs Mount Tsukuba from Tsutsujigaoka Station to Nyotai-san Station.

Basic data
Opened: 1965
Distance: 
Vertical interval: 
Stations: 2
Speed: 
Trip time: 6 minutes
The ropeway tram passes 2 steel towers on the way to the final destination.

See also

List of aerial lifts in Japan
Mount Tsukuba Cable Car

References

External links
 Tsukubasan Cable Car & Ropeway official website
 Mt Tsukuba Cable Car & Ropeway official website

Aerial tramways in Japan
Articles containing video clips
1965 establishments in Japan